Ballinascarty, also known as Ballinascarthy, is a village in County Cork, Ireland.

Location

Places of interest
Nearby is the Lisselan Estate, the gardens of which are open to the public. There is also a golf course. Henry Ford, the well-known machine manufacturer was of Irish descent. Henry Ford's father, William, and grandfather, John, were born in Ballinascarty before their emigration to Detroit, Michigan, United States. Henry Ford went on to be one of the most influential people in the automotive industry, inventing mass production and the Fordson model F tractor, which put many small-scale tractor manufacturers out of business. A memorial to Henry Ford was placed in the town in the shape of a Model T statue on 3 September 2000.

Sport
Ballinascathy is home to Ballinascarthy GAA.

People
 Teddy Holland, former Cork county Gaelic Football player
 John Ford, grandfather of Henry Ford

See also
 List of towns and villages in Ireland
 Ballinascarthy railway station

References

External links

DiscoverIreland.com
Ballinascarthy.com

Towns and villages in County Cork